Banking Hours 10 to 4 is a 2012 Indian Malayalam-language film directed by K. Madhu, starring Anoop Menon, Meghna Raj, Jishnu, Kailash, Shankar . Crime Thriller Movie is Written by Sumesh Madhu  &  Amal K Joby.

Plot 
Banking Hours 10 to 4 is a suspense thriller happening in a bank. A person is killed inside the bank premises and the suspense is revealed within the banking hours of 10 to 4. Anoop Menon plays the role of an investigation officer.

Cast 
 Anoop Menon as Sravan Varma I.P.S
 Meghna Raj as Revathy Varma I.P.S
 Jishnu as  Avinash Sekhar, A Commando Officer
 Mithun Ramesh as Vishnu Ramachandran
 Kailash as Ajay Vasudevan
 Raghavan as Lakshmi Priya's father
 Swasika as Aparna Shekhar
 Shankar as Fernandez
 Ashokan as Salman Azharudeen / Priest
 Tini Tom as Idikkula Stephen
 Nishanth Sagar
 Arun
 Kiran Raj
 Master Arun
 Munna as Rahul
Krishna as Roy Mathew, the Bank Manager
 Sudheesh as Ravi Kumar, the peon
 Sarin H. Nair as one of the IT Professionals
 Vishnupriya as Pooja
 Sreelatha Namboothiri as Fernandez's sister
 Chali Pala as Sarath Babu
 Ambika Mohan as Bhavani, Ajay Vasudevan's mother
 Deepika Mohan
 Shafna as Merrin Fernandez 
 Sarayu
 Renjith Reghu
 Lakshmipriya as Lakshmi
 Vijay Menon as Dr. John
 Sathaar as Vasudevan Pillai
 Irshad
 Jayakrishnan as Hari
 Manu Raj
 Majeed
 Midhun Ramesh
 Manoj Paravoor
 Roshan Basheer
 Biyon
 Pradeep Kottayam
 Surabhi as Priya Lal, the Receptionist
 Krishnakumar Thampi as Bank Accountant

Reception 
The movie opened from mixed to negative reviews from the critics and the audience alike. The movie was mainly criticized for the slow direction from K Madhu. Sify.com gave an "average" verdict and said "Banking Hours 10-4 may leave the discerning viewers with many doubts but could well be an entertaining one, if you don't dig too deep or go without much expectation." Nowrunning also gave a negative review and gave 1.9 stars out of 5 and added "'Banking Hours' lacks that vital spark that should keep the spirit up in whodunits."

References

External links 
 

2010s Malayalam-language films
2012 thriller films
2012 films
Indian thriller films
Films directed by K. Madhu